Taibo was the legendary founder of the State of Wu in ancient China.

Taibo or Tai Bo may refer to:

 A name of Li Bai, Chinese poet
 Paco Ignacio Taibo II, Spanish/Mexican writer
 Taibo River, a river in Central Africa lying on the border of Chad and the Central African Republic

See also
 Tae Bo, an aerobic exercise routine